Oodweyne is a district in the central  Togdheer region of Somaliland. The plains of this land-mass was historically referred to as Garoodi.

See also
Administrative divisions of Somaliland
Regions of Somaliland
Districts of Somaliland

References

External links
 Administrative map of Oodweyne District

Districts of Somaliland

Togdheer